Kilbrin is a civil parish in the barony of Duhallow, County Cork, Ireland. Once an independent parish, Kilbrin is now joined to the parish of Ballyclough. Kilbrin derives its name from an early church site or monastery namely Cill Bhrain, i.e. the church of Saint Bran.

Kilbrin is within the Dáil constituency of Cork North-West.

Archbishop Thomas Croke, whom Croke Park stadium was named after, was born in Castlecor (parish of Kilbrin).

See also
 List of towns and villages in Ireland
 Kilbrin GAA

References

External links
Kilbrin website
Kilbrin Parish Map (archived)
Catholic primary schools in Diocese of Cork and Ross (archived)

Civil parishes of County Cork